This list of museums in Hawaii contains museums which are defined for this context as institutions (including nonprofit organizations, government entities, and private businesses) that collect and care for objects of cultural, artistic, scientific, or historical interest and make their collections or related exhibits available for public viewing. Non-profit and university art galleries are also included.  Museums that exist only in cyberspace (virtual museums) are not included.

Active museums

Defunct museums
 Hawaii Maritime Center, Honolulu, closed in 2009
 Hilo Art Museum, Kurtistown, Big Island
 Kamuela Museum, Kamuela, Hawaii
 Kauai Children's Discovery Museum, Lihue
 North Shore Surf and Cultural Museum, Waialua
 Pacific Aerospace Museum, Honolulu, located until 2000 at the Honolulu International Airport, displays now at the Pacific Aviation Museum Pearl Harbor
 Paper Airplane Museum, Kahului, Maui, information, closed since at least 2004
 The Contemporary Museum, Honolulu, merged into the Honolulu Academy of Arts in July 2011. The museum was renamed Honolulu Museum of Art Spalding House and remains at its Spalding House location

See also
 Aquaria in Hawaii (category)
 Nature Centers in Hawaii

Resources
 Hawai‘i Museums Association
 Hawaii Web - sites to see in Hawaii

References

Museums
Museums
Hawaii
Hawaii